Taisto Juhani Suutarinen (born 24 May 1943) is a Finnish former biathlete.

Biathlon results
All results are sourced from the International Biathlon Union.

Olympic Games
2 medals (2 silver)

World Championships
4 medals (3 gold, 1 silver)

*During Olympic seasons competitions are only held for those events not included in the Olympic program.
**Sprint was added as an event in 1974.

References

External links
 

1943 births
Living people
People from Parikkala
Finnish male biathletes
Biathletes at the 1968 Winter Olympics
Biathletes at the 1972 Winter Olympics
Biathletes at the 1976 Winter Olympics
Olympic biathletes of Finland
Medalists at the 1972 Winter Olympics
Medalists at the 1976 Winter Olympics
Olympic medalists in biathlon
Olympic silver medalists for Finland
Biathlon World Championships medalists
Sportspeople from South Karelia